Yucatán is a Mexican state.

Yucatán also commonly refers to
Yucatán Peninsula, an area divided between Mexico, Belize and Guatemala

Yucatán or Yucatan may also refer to:

Places

Mexico
Republic of Yucatán, an independent country that existed briefly in the 1840s

United States
Yucatan, Minnesota
Yucatan Township, Houston County, Minnesota
Yucatan, Missouri

Other uses
Yucatán (film), a 2018 Spanish comedy film
Yucatan crater, an impact crater in Mexico
Yucatán, a Chilean secret police code name for a building in Santiago used by Dirección de Inteligencia Nacional
Yucatan, an indie band from Bethesda, Gwynedd

See also
Venados de Yucatán, a soccer team
Yucatán Channel, a strait between Mexico and Cuba connecting the Caribbean Sea with the Gulf of Mexico
Yucatan Block, a crustal block in the North American Plate
Yucatan Landing, Louisiana